Partnership2Gether, or P2G, is a program connecting some 550 Jewish communities in the Diaspora with 45 Israel Partnership areas, primarily in Israel's peripheral Negev and Galilee districts. Partnership2Gether focuses on people-to-people interaction, building community and leadership.

When it was established in 1994 by the Jewish Agency for Israel, United Jewish Communities, and Keren Hayesod-United Israel Appeal, it was known as Partnership 2000. It represented a major transition from the Project Renewal-twinning model, which focused on transforming disadvantaged Israeli communities through building physical and social infrastructure.

Every year more than 10,000 volunteers work together in P2G.

See also
Town twinning
Jewish Agency for Israel

External links
Official Site
"Partnership 2000" Supplement in Haaretz Newspaper

Jewish organizations based in Israel
Zionist organizations
Jewish Agency for Israel